Meld is the visual diff and merge tool, targeted at developers. It allows users to compare two or three files or directories visually, color-coding the different lines.

Meld can be used for comparing files, directories, and version controlled repositories. It provides two- and three-way comparison of both files and directories, and supports many version control systems including Git, Mercurial, Baazar, CVS and Subversion.

Meld is free and open-source software subject to the terms of the GNU General Public License (GPL-2.0-or-later).

Requirements
Requirements for Meld 3.18.0 are as follows:
 Python 3.3
 GTK+ 3.14
 GLib 2.36
 PyGObject 3.14
 GtkSourceView 3.14
 pycairo

See also
 
 Comparison of file comparison tools

References

External links
 

Free file comparison tools
GNOME Developer Tools
Software that uses GTK
Software that uses PyGObject
Free software programmed in Python